Volker Kreutzer is a West German sprint canoer who competed in the late 1980s. He won three medals in the K-4 500 m event at the ICF Canoe Sprint World Championships with a silver (1989) and two bronzes (1986, 1987).

References

German male canoeists
Living people
Year of birth missing (living people)
ICF Canoe Sprint World Championships medalists in kayak